Ángel David Sanabria Álvarez (born 26 July 1984) is a Guatemalan football defender who currently plays for Heredia Jaguares de Peten of the Guatemalan premier division.

Club career
Sanabria started his professional career at Cobán Imperial and has played for several Guatemalan top level sides, among them local giants Comunicaciones and Xelajú MC whom he left after only a short spell. He joined Heredia in 2008 to be closer to his family and moved to then champions Jalapa in July 2009.

International career
He made his debut for Guatemala in a July 2004 friendly match against El Salvador and has earned a total of 35 caps, scoring no goals. He has represented his country in 12 FIFA World Cup qualification matches and played at the 2005 UNCAF Nations Cup and the 2005 CONCACAF Gold Cup

His most recent international was an October 2006 friendly match against Honduras.

References

External links

1984 births
Living people
People from Petén Department
Guatemalan footballers
Guatemala international footballers
2005 UNCAF Nations Cup players
2005 CONCACAF Gold Cup players
Comunicaciones F.C. players
Xelajú MC players

Association football defenders